Linda Sokhulu is a South African actress. In 2014, she received best actress nomination at the 10th Africa Movie Academy Awards.

Career 
Starting in 2004, Sokhulu played "Cleo Khuzwayo" in Generations. In 2013, Sokhulu starred in her first feature film, Felix, and played the role of the mother of an aspiring teenage saxophonist. She got nominated for best actress at SAFTA and Africa Movie Academy Awards. The film also won awards at Durban International Film Festival, where it was described as "a worthy contender with any Hollywood blockbuster". In 2007, she played "Nomathemba" in local soap Ubizo: The Calling. In 2008, she play "Pamela" in Sokhulu & Partners. On 27 January 2022, Sokhulu joined the cast of 7de Laan in a contract starring role.

Filmography 
 Isidingo 
 Generations (2004 - 2007)
 A Place Called Home (2006)
 Ubizo: The Calling (2007)
 Shreds and Dreams (2010 & 2014)
 Felix (2013)
 Rhythm City (2019)
 Umkhokha (2021)
 7de Laan (2022)

Accolades 
 2012 Golden Horn Award for Best Actress in a Lead Role in a TV drama
 2016 Golden Horn Award for Best Actress in a Lead Role in a TV drama 
 2016 Golden Horn Award for Best Supporting Actress in a TV soap 
 2017 Golden Horn Award for Best Actress in a Lead Role in a TV drama
 Africa Movie Academy Award for Best Actress in a Leading Role

Personal life 
Sokhulu was born on September 13, 1976 in Durban, however she spent her formative years in Umlazi. She attended St. Anne's Diocesan College in Hilton, KwaZulu-Natal near Pietermaritzburg (1990-1993) before attending Cambridge College in 1994 then studied fashion at Technikon Natal.

References

External links 
 

1976 births
South African television actresses
South African film actresses
Living people
University of South Africa alumni
Cambridge College alumni
People from Durban
People from uMlalazi Local Municipality